The 2020–21 Ohio State Buckeyes men's basketball team represented Ohio State University in the 2020–21 NCAA Division I men's basketball season. Their head coach was Chris Holtmann, in his fourth season with the Buckeyes. The Buckeyes played their home games at Value City Arena in Columbus, Ohio as members of the Big Ten Conference.

They finished the season 21–10, 12–8 in Big Ten play to finish in fifth place. They defeated Minnesota, Purdue, and Michigan before losing to Illinois in overtime in the championship game of the Big Ten tournament. They received an at-large bid to the NCAA tournament as the No. 2 seed in the South region.  However, they were upset in the First Round by No. 15-seeded Oral Roberts.

Previous season

The Buckeyes finished the 2019–20 season 21–10, 11–9 in Big Ten play to finish in a tie for fifth place. The 2020 Big Ten men's basketball tournament and 2020 NCAA Division I men's basketball tournament were cancelled due to the COVID-19 pandemic.

Offseason

Departures

Incoming transfers

2020 recruiting class

2021 Recruiting class

Roster

Schedule and results

Ohio State canceled its game against Alabama A&M due to COVID-19 issues at Alabama A&M. They also postponed their game against Penn State, rescheduling the game to January 27, 2021.

|-
!colspan=9 style=| Regular season

|-
!colspan=9 style=|Big Ten tournament

|-
!colspan=9 style=|NCAA tournament

Source

Rankings

*AP does not release post-NCAA Tournament rankings^Coaches did not release a Week 1 poll.

References

Ohio State Buckeyes men's basketball seasons
Ohio State
Ohio State